The Detroit House of Correction (DeHoCo), opened in 1861, was owned and run by the City of Detroit but originally accepted prisoners from throughout the state including women. This was the first State operated prison for female felons. The state renovated the woman's division into the new Phoenix facility. The Detroit House of Correction was transferred to the state in 1986, renamed to Western Wayne Correctional Facility, and became a women's facility for the rest of its tenure. It closed in December 2004 and all inmates and staff were transferred to the Women's Huron Valley Correctional Facility in Ypsilanti.

History

The first Detroit House of Correction opened in 1861 near Detroit's Eastern Market.

A prison camp, with inmates sleeping in tents, was opened in 1920. A permanent  maximum security facility was completed in 1930.

The facility was then renamed to Western Wayne Correctional Facility and became a women's facility for the rest of its tenure. The 1930 building closed and has sat abandoned since.

In the late 1980s, the warden of the facility took bribes in return for favors from inmates.

The facility closed in December 2004 and all inmates and staff were transferred to the Women's Huron Valley Correctional Facility in Ypsilanti.

Detroit ownership
The land was available for purchase by the government due to unpaid taxes.

In May 2016, the City of Detroit, is in ownership of 190 acres of the land Plymouth Township acquired. The courts agreed that under Michigan land law, the ownership of the property still resides with the City of Detroit. The other 133 acres, of the 323 Plymouth Township acquired, was correctly sold, by Detroit, in 2006, to a private developer, who did not pay their land taxes, and forfeited the land to the township. Just to the east of this property, the City of Detroit, owns 45 acres of the original site, where dilapidated prison structures still stood until they were demolished in the spring of 2017.

Notable inmates
Notable inmates during the prison's history included:
 Euphemia Mondich
 Curtis Sliwa
 Belle Starr
 David King Udall

See also

 List of Michigan state prisons

References

1861 establishments in Michigan
2004 disestablishments in Michigan
Buildings and structures in Wayne County, Michigan
Buildings and structures in Detroit
Prisons in Michigan